The Great British Trees were 50 trees selected by The Tree Council in 2002 to spotlight trees in the United Kingdom in honour of the Queen's Golden Jubilee.

England

Western England 
 Tortworth Chestnut in Tortworth, Gloucestershire 
 Westonbirt Lime Tree in Westonbirt Arboretum, Gloucestershire
 Sweet Chestnut in Croft Castle, Herefordshire
 Royal Oak in Boscobel, Shropshire
 The Bewdley Sweet Chestnut in Bewdley, Worcestershire

South West 
 Domesday Oak in Ashton Court, Bristol
 Darley Oak, Upton Cross, Linkinhorne, Cornwall
 Bicton College Monkey Puzzle in Bicton Park, East Budleigh, Devon
 Heavitree Yew in Heavitree, near Exeter, Devon
 Ashbrittle Yew in Ashbrittle, Wellington, Somerset

Southern England 

 Brighton Pavilion Elm in Brighton, East Sussex
 Queen Elizabeth Oak in Cowdray Park, Midhurst, West Sussex
 Selborne Yew in Selborne, Hampshire
 Wellington's Wellingtonia, a Giant Sequoia, in Stratfield Saye, Hampshire
 Tolpuddle Martyrs Tree in Dorset
 The Big Belly Oak in Savernake Forest, Wiltshire

London and the Home Counties 

 The Cage Pollard in Burnham Beeches, Buckinghamshire
 Ankerwycke Yew in Wraysbury, Berkshire
 The World's End Black Poplar in Roydon, Essex
 The Great Oak, Panshanger Park in Hertingfordbury, Hertfordshire
 Sidney Oak in Penshurst Place, Kent
 Sweet chestnut 'The Seven Sisters Chestnut' in Viceroy's Wood, Penshurst, Kent
 Charlton House Mulberry in Greenwich
 'Old Lion' Ginkgo in Kew Gardens, Richmond, London
 Crowhurst Yew in Surrey

Eastern England 

 Metasequoia at Emmanuel College, Britain's first Dawn Redwood, in Cambridge University Botanic Garden
 Great London Plane of Ely, Britain's first London Plane in Ely, Cambridgeshire
 Newton's Apple Tree in Woolsthorpe Manor, Grantham, Lincolnshire
 Bowthorpe Oak in Bourne, Lincolnshire
 Kett's Oak in Hethersett, Norfolk
 Chedgrave Jubilee Oak in Norfolk

The Midlands 
 Morton Horse Chestnut in Derbyshire
 Lebanon Cedar in Childrey, Oxfordshire
 Major Oak in Sherwood Forest, Nottinghamshire
 Original Bramley apple in Southwell, Nottinghamshire

Northern England 

 The Appleton Thorn Tree in Appleton Thorn, Cheshire
 Marton Oak in Marton, Cheshire
 Borrowdale Yew in Cumbria
 Levens Hall Yew in Levens Hall, Cumbria
 Holker Lime in Holker Hall, Cumbria
 Wild Cherry in Fountains Abbey and Studley Royal, near Ripon, North Yorkshire

Northern Ireland 
Great Yew, a pair of yews now appearing to be a single tree, in Crom Castle, Fermanagh

Scotland 

Granny Pine, a 300-year-old Scots Pine at Glen Affric, Highlands
Fortingall Yew, a 2,000-3,000-year-old yew in Perth and Kinross
Parent Larch, a European Larch in the grounds of a Hilton hotel built by the Duke of Atholl in Dunkeld, Perth and Kinross
A Douglas-fir, in the grounds of Scone Palace where David Douglas was born, in Perth and Kinross
A silver fir, in Ardkinglas Woodland Garden, Argyll
Capon Tree, an oak in what used to be the Jedforest, Jedburgh, Borders
The Craigends Yew, a 600-year-old layering Taxus baccata in Houston, Renfrewshire

Wales 
 Ley's Whitebeam, one of only 16 Sorbus leyana (a type of whitebeam) growing wild anywhere, in Merthyr Tydfil
The tree was blown over by the wind in 2013.
Llangernyw Yew, the oldest tree in Europe (Between 4,000 and 5,000 years old)), a yew in the churchyard of St Digain’s, Llangernyw, Conwy

See also 
List of individual trees
Great Trees of London
Tree of the Year

References

External links 

 Great British Trees press release

Forests and woodlands of the United Kingdom
Trees
British
British

2002 in the United Kingdom